Saint-Pern (Gallo: Saent-Pèrn) is a commune in the Ille-et-Vilaine department in Brittany in northwestern France.

Saint-Pern is the burial place of Saint Jeanne Jugan, where the motherhouse for the Little Sisters of the Poor at La Tour St. Joseph was located.

Population
Inhabitants of Saint-Pern are called saint-pernais in French.

See also
Communes of the Ille-et-Vilaine department

References

External links

Mayors of Ille-et-Vilaine Association 

Communes of Ille-et-Vilaine